This is a list of Superfund sites in Kansas designated under the Comprehensive Environmental Response, Compensation, and Liability Act (CERCLA) environmental law.  The CERCLA federal law of 1980 authorized the United States Environmental Protection Agency (EPA) to create a list of polluted locations requiring a long-term response to clean up hazardous material contaminations.   These locations are known as Superfund sites, and are placed on the National Priorities List (NPL).

The NPL guides the EPA in "determining which sites warrant further investigation" for environmental remediation.  As of March 26, 2010, there were 11 Superfund sites on the National Priorities List in Kansas.  One more site has been proposed for entry on the list.  Five sites have been cleaned up and removed from the list.

Superfund sites

See also
List of Superfund sites in the United States
List of environmental issues
List of waste types
TOXMAP

References

External links
EPA (Region 7) list of Superfund sites in Kansas
EPA list of proposed Superfund sites in Kansas
EPA list of current Superfund sites in Kansas
EPA list of Superfund site construction completions in Kansas
EPA list of partially deleted Superfund sites in Kansas
EPA list of deleted Superfund sites in Kansas

Kansas
Superfund
Superfund